Etoile is an unincorporated community in  Barren County, Kentucky, United States. The Etoile Post Office  closed in 1988.

Previously called Caney Fork, the post office opened in 1886 was named Etoile, Étoile being the French for star, for unknown reasons.

References

Unincorporated communities in Barren County, Kentucky
Unincorporated communities in Kentucky